The Société des Ateliers d'Aviation Louis Bréguet also known as Bréguet Aviation was a French aircraft manufacturer.

The company was set up in 1911 by the aviation pioneer Louis Charles Breguet. Bréguet Aviation was extremely active during the First World War, producing numerous military aircraft, such as the pioneering metal Bréguet 14 day-bomber, for the Allies. During the interwar period, the firm's aircraft set several records for non-stop crossings of the Atlantic Ocean, as well as with the unconventional Bréguet-Dorand Gyroplane Laboratoire. It was active during the Second World War, surviving the conflict and largely focusing on commercial transport aircraft during the postwar years. Its most notable military programmes during the Cold War include the Bréguet 1150 Atlantic and the SEPECAT Jaguar. During 1971, Bréguet Aviation merged with Dassault to form Avions Marcel Dassault-Bréguet Aviation, which was subsequently rebranded as Dassault Aviation.

History
The company was founded during 1911 by Louis-Charles Breguet, an early French airplane designer and builder, and his brother, Jacques. That same year, Bréguet's first airplane established a new speed record during a  flight. In 1912, Bréguet constructed his first seaplane.

During the First World War, the company produced a range of military-orientated aircraft to assist the French war effort. In particular, it developed capable reconnaissance aircraft that saw used not only during the conflict but long into the 1920s as well. During this time, Bréguet Aviation also played a pioneering role in the development of metal aircraft, such as the Bréguet 14 day-bomber (almost entirely made of aluminum), which was one of the most famous French combat aircraft of its era. The Bréguet-14's performance was such it was not only procured by the French military, but also exported to the fill the ranks of sixteen squadrons of the American Expeditionary Force. Unable to meet wartime demands for its designs itself, production agreements were made with other firms to produce its aircraft as well. Between 1917 and 1919, just under 2,000 Bréguet-designed aircraft were license-produced by the aviation interest of French industrial conglomerate Michelin.

During the interwar period, Bréguet-built aircraft set several records; one plane performed the first non-stop crossing of the South Atlantic in 1927, while another made a 4,500-mile (7,242-kilometer) flight across the Atlantic Ocean during 1933, which was the longest non-stop Atlantic flight up to that time.

Bréguet was engaged in the rearmament efforts during the late 1930s, producing numerous military aircraft in the run-up to and during the Second World War. After resuming normal operations in the immediate postwar climate, the company largely focused on the development of commercial transports and other large aircraft designs. On 4 May 1955, the company's founder, Louis-Charles Bréguet, died in Paris, France.

In response to a NATO specification for a long-range maritime patrol aircraft to replace the Lockheed P2V Neptune, Bréguet submitted its own design, the Br 1150, which was chosen as the winner in late 1958. Accordingly, a multinational consortium, Société d'Étude et de Construction de Bréguet Atlantic (SECBAT) was set up to develop and build this aircraft, which was named the 1150 Atlantic.Elvert, Schirmann and Lang 2008, p. 182. An initial order for 60 Atlantics 40 for France and 20 for Germany was placed in 1963; deliveries of the Atlantic commenced during 1965. The production line was reactivated following further orders from the Netherlands and Italy; this second production batch made its deliveries between 1972 and 1974. During 1978, the French Government authorised development of an updated version of the Atlantic, the Atlantic Nouvelle Génération or Atlantique 2, which involved little change to either airframe and engines while equipment and avionics were extensively revised."Maritime Muscle". Flight International, 27 June 1981. p. 2014. Deliveries started in 1989 with 28 eventually built, from an original requirement for 42.Penny, Stewart. "Military Aircraft Directory Part 1". Flight International, 4 August 1999.

During the 1960s, Bréguet Aviation became involved in the multinational joint venture company SEPECAT (Société Européenne de Production de l'Avion d'École de Combat et d'Appui Tactique – the "European company for the production of a combat trainer and tactical support aircraft") together with the British Aircraft Corporation (BAC) to produce the Jaguar strike aircraft. Though based in part on the Breguet Br.121, using the same basic configuration and an innovative French-designed landing gear, the Jaguar was built incorporating major elements of design from BAC – notably the wing and high lift devices. Production of components was split between Breguet and BAC, while the aircraft themselves would be assembled on two production lines; one in the UK and one in France, To avoid any duplication of work, each aircraft component had only one source.

Reportedly, collaboration between BAC and Breguet went relatively well. However, following Dassault's takeover of Breguet during 1971, the firm encouraged acceptance of its own designs, such as the Super Étendard naval attack aircraft and the Mirage F1 interceptor, for which the newly combined company would receive more workshare and profit, over the Jaguar.Jackson 1992, p. 77.

Aircraft

Bréguet-Richet Gyroplane (1907) - experimental single-seat helicopter-like craft with four rotors.
Bréguet-Richet Gyroplane No.2 (1908) Tandem biplane with a pair of large inclined propellers providing both thrust and lift.  
Bréguet Type I (1909) - Single-seat tractor configuration biplane with boxkite-like tail on booms.
Bréguet Type II (1910) - Development of the Type I, with a tricycle undercarriage and the tail carried at the end of a fuselage-like structure and a pair of booms.
Bréguet Type III (1910) - Development of Type II, three-seat, rotary engine
Bréguet Type IV (1911) - Development of Type III: the first aircraft to be produced in quantity by Bréguet.

Bréguet Type R.U1 (1911) - Single-engine biplane
Bréguet Aerhydroplane (1913) - Single-engine one-seat seaplane. Did not fly
Bréguet 4 (1914) - Single-engine two-seat biplane bomber. Pusher configuration
Bréguet 5 (1915) - Single-engine two-seat biplane escort fighter. Variant of Bre.4
Bréguet 6 (1915) - Version of Bréguet 5 with different engine
Bréguet 12 (1918) - Version of Bréguet 5 with 37mm cannon and searchlight (night fighter)
Bréguet 14 (1916) - Single-engine two-seat biplane bomber aircraft
Bréguet 16 (1918) - Larger version of Bréguet 14. Bomber aircraft
Bréguet 17 (1918) - Smaller version of Bréguet 14. Fighter aircraft.
Bréguet 19 (1922) - Single-engine two-seat biplane reconnaissance/light bomber/sport aircraft
Bréguet 20 Leviathan (1922) - Twin/four-engine 20-seat airliner
Bréguet 22 (1922-3) - Bréguet 20 development
Bréguet 26T (1926) - Single-engine biplane eight-passenger airliner
Bréguet 280T (1928) - Development of 26T with improved fuselage aerodynamics
License built Short S.8 Calcutta (1928) - Three-engine fifteen-seat biplane transport aircraft
Bréguet 27 (1929) - Single-engine two-seat biplane reconnaissance aircraft
Bréguet 270 (1929) - Development of 27 using steel chassis
Bréguet 393T (1931) - Three-engine biplane airliner
Bréguet 410 - Twin-engine light bomber
Bréguet-Dorand Gyroplane Laboratoire (1935) - Helicopter prototype
Bréguet G.111 (1949) - coaxial helicopter prototype
Bréguet 460 Vultur - Twin-engine light bomber
Bréguet 470 Fulgur (1936) - Twin-engine airliner, only one example built.
Bréguet 480 - Long-range bomber project
Bréguet 482 (1947) - Four-engine bomber, designed prior to war, only a single example built
Bréguet 500 Colmar - Transport development of the Br.480
Bréguet 521 Bizerte (1933) - Development of the S.8 Calcutta. Long-range patrol flying boat
Bréguet 530 Saigon - Civilian version of 521
Bréguet 693 (1938) - Twin-engine two-seat monoplane ground attack/fighter aircraft
Bréguet 730 (1938) - Four-engine long-range flying boat. . Also Br.731
Bréguet 763 Deux-Ponts (1949) - Br.761/763/765 Four-engine double-deck large airliner. Piston engines.
Bréguet 790 Nautilus - Single-engine flying boat
Bréguet 890 Mercure - Civil/military transport
Bréguet Br 900 Louisette - (1948) Single-seat competition sailplane.
Bréguet Br 901 Mouette - (1954) Single-seat competition sailplane.
Bréguet Br 904 Nymphale - (1956) Two-seat sailplane.
Bréguet Br 905 Fauvette - (1958) Single-seat competition sailplane.
Bréguet 940 - Four-engine STOL transport aircraft. Turboprop engines
Bréguet 941 (1961) - Four-engine STOL transport aircraft. Turboprop engines
Bréguet 960 Vultur (1951) - Br.960 Twin-engine two-seat naval anti-submarine aircraft. Jet engine and turboprop engine (mixed power)
Bréguet 1001 Taon (1957) - Br.1001 Single-engine single-seat jet strike aircraft.
Bréguet 1050 Alizé (1956) - Br.1050 Single-engine three-seat naval anti-submarine aircraft. Turboprop engine

Bréguet 1100 (1957) - Twin-engine jet fighter
Bréguet 1150 Atlantic (1961) - Br.1150 Twin-engine naval reconnaissance aircraft. Turboprop engines

Leduc aircraft
 Leduc 0.10
 Leduc 0.21
 Leduc 0.22

Automobile production 
Before 1914, in addition to producing aircraft, the firm produced a few six cylinder-engined cars.

During the Second World War, the company produced an electric car powered by batteries and propelled by an "off-the-shelf" motor from Paris-Rhône. The motor was capable of producing two different levels of output. "First gear" and "Reverse gear" were provided with 36 volts while "Second gear" equated to 72 volts.

The car had a modern looking all-enveloping two-seater body with a relatively long tapered tail which contained the motor and some of the batteries.   It had four wheels but the rear axle which delivered power to the road was relatively narrow. The car was actively marketed during 1941 which was a period of price instability.   In August 1941 the Bréguet electric car was priced at 56,000 francs: during the same month the Citroën Light bodied 11 (still listed despite production by now being down to a trickle or suspended) was priced at 35,630 francs.

The Bréguet electric car was produced not at the firm's principal plant at Toulouse but at a smaller plant at Anglet (between Biarritz and Bayonne).

See also
List of aircraft (Br-Bz)

References
Citations

Bibliography
 Bowman, Martin W. SEPECAT Jaguar. London: Pen and Sword Books, 2007. .
 Elvert, Jürgen. Sylvain Schirmann, Peter Lang. Changing Times: Germany in 20th-Century Europe, Peter Lang, 2008. .
 Jackson, Paul. "SEPECAT Jaguar". World Air Power Journal. Volume 11, Winter 1992, pp. 52–111. London: Aerospace Publishing, 1992. . ISSN 0959-7050.
 Lambert, Mark. (editor). Jane's All The World's Aircraft 1993–94. Coulsdon, UK:Jane's Data Division, 1993. .
 "The New Generation Atlantics". Air International, November 1981, Vol. 21 No. 5. pp. 213–218, 252–253.
 Wagner, Paul J. Air Force Tac Recce Aircraft: NATO and Non-aligned Western European Air Force Tactical Reconnaissance Aircraft of the Cold War. Pittsburgh, PA: Dorrance Publishing, 2009. .
 Wallace, William. Britain's Bilateral Links Within Western Europe. London: Routledge and Kegan Paul, 1984. .
 "World News: Jaguar First Flight." Flight International via flightglobal.com,'' 12 September 1968, p. 391.

Further reading

External links

 Dassault Aviation
 Association of the Friends of Bréguet Aviation

Defunct aircraft manufacturers of France
Manufacturing companies established in 1911
Manufacturing companies disestablished in 1971
Defunct helicopter manufacturers

French companies established in 1911
1971 disestablishments in France